John Cornwall is the name of:

 John Cornwall (Upper Canada politician), farmer and political figure in Upper Canada
John Cornwall (c. 1366–1414), MP for Shropshire
John Cornwall (died 1608), MP for Marlborough (UK Parliament constituency)
 John Cornwall, 1st Baron Fanhope (died 1443), English nobleman, soldier and one of the most respected chivalric figures of his era
 John Cornwall (South Australian politician) (1935–2018), former member of the South Australian Legislative Council

See also
 John of Cornwall (disambiguation), multiple people
 John Cornwell (disambiguation), multiple people